Waltz of Love (German: Liebeswalzer) is a 1930 German musical film directed by Wilhelm Thiele and starring Lilian Harvey, Willy Fritsch and Georg Alexander. It was shot at the Babelsberg Studios in Berlin with sets designed by the art director Erich Kettelhut. It premiered at the Gloria-Palast in Berlin on 7 February 1930. A separate English language version The Love Waltz was also produced.

Cast
 Lilian Harvey as Princess Eva 
 Willy Fritsch as Bobby Fould 
 Georg Alexander as Archduke Peter Ferdinand 
 Julia Serda as Duchess of Lauenburg 
 Karl Ludwig Diehl as Marshal 
 Hans Junkermann as Fould 
 Lotte Spira as Archduchess Melany 
 Viktor Schwanneke as Dr. Lemke 
 Karl Etlinger as Dr. Popper 
 Marianne Winkelstern   
 Rudolf Biebrach  
 Willy Prager   
 Emmy von Stetten   
 Austin Egen   
 Gertrude De Lalsky   
 Lilian Mower

References

Bibliography
 Bergfelder, Tim & Cargnelli, Christian. Destination London: German-speaking emigrés and British cinema, 1925-1950. Berghahn Books, 2008.
 Hardt, Ursula. From Caligari to California: Erich Pommer's life in the International Film Wars. Berghahn Books, 1996.
 Kreimeier, Klaus. The Ufa Story: A History of Germany's Greatest Film Company, 1918-1945. University of California Press, 1999.

External links
 

1930 films
1930 musical comedy films
German musical comedy films
Films of the Weimar Republic
1930s German-language films
German multilingual films
Films directed by Wilhelm Thiele
Operetta films
Films set in Europe
UFA GmbH films
German black-and-white films
Films produced by Erich Pommer
1930 multilingual films
1930s German films